Fethi Nourine (born 14 June 1991) is an Algerian judoka, who has competed in the under 73 kg weight category, and won three African Judo Championships. Nourine has been suspended by the International Judo Federation until July 2031 for refusing to fight an Israeli athlete at the 2020 Summer Olympics.

Career

Raised in Oran, Algeria, he started judo aged seven after being introduced to the discipline by his brother. In 2014, he won the under 66 kg event at the African Open, beating fellow Algerian Houd Zourdani in the final. It was Algeria's first gold medal of the tournament. He became African champion in the under 73 kg event after winning the event at the 2018 African Judo Championships. He retained his title the following year in Tunisia. That same year he participated in the World Championships in Japan. He won his first match but then pulled out of the tournament as he refused to face his next scheduled opponent, the Israeli competitor Tohar Butbul for what he said were political reasons. In 2021, Nourine won the under 73 kg event at the African Judo Championships.

Selected to compete at the delayed 2020 Summer Olympics in the -73 kg weight class, Nourine and his coach Amar Benikhlef announced his withdrawal following the conclusion of the draw of competitors. Nourine was quoted as saying his political support for the Palestinian cause made it impossible for him to compete against an Israeli like Tohar Butbul, the # 5 seed in the tournament, who he was drawn to potentially face in the second round, had he won in the first round. The International Judo Federation announced his and his coach's immediate suspensions on 24 July 2021, pending a further investigation, and sent Nourine and his coach back home to Algeria from Tokyo. In September 2021, Nourine and Benikhlef were both suspended for ten years, until July 2031.

References

1991 births
Living people
Algerian male judoka
Sportspeople from Oran
Olympic Games controversies
Arab–Israeli conflict
Judoka at the 2020 Summer Olympics
Olympic judoka of Algeria
21st-century Algerian people
20th-century Algerian people